You Are My Glory is a 2021 Chinese television series starring Yang Yang and Dilraba Dilmurat. Based on the novel of the same name written by Gu Man, it mainly tells the story of the popular actress Qiao Jingjing and her former high school classmate Yu Tu as they unexpectedly reunite to play the mobile game Honor of Kings. It premiered on Tencent Video and WeTV on July 26, 2021 and ran until August 30, 2021.

As of 20 August 2021, the series has reached 4 billion views.

Cast

Main
Yang Yang as Yu Tu
Graduated from the top 1 university with a major in finance, and has been the unattainable god of learning since he was a child. Influenced by his family, he is very obsessed with aerospace. Because of the game, he falls in love with high school classmate, Qiao Jingjing. 
Dilraba Dilmurat as Qiao Jingjing
Popular actress. When she was a student, she had a crush on Yu Tu, and ten years later, she became a first-tier flow actress. The game she endorsed was a big hit, but her image as a game master was punctured. In order to regain her image as an endorser, she started to find a teacher to teach her, and by chance, she met Yu Tu again in the game. When Yu Tu hesitates to quit his job as an aerospace designer and switch to the financial industry so that his family can live a stable life, she keeps encouraging him to bravely pursue his dream.

Supporting

Yu Tu's family
Cao Yi as Yu Tu's father
Cui Yi as Yu Tu's mother
Wang Rui as Xiao Liu, Yu Tu's cousin
Qiao Jingjing's family
Wang Quan You as Qiao Jingjing's father
Yan Qingyu as Qiao Jingjing's mother
Zheng Xiao Mao as Qiao Jingjing's grandfather
Zhu Huai Xu as Qiao Jingjing's grandmother
Liu Lei as Qiao Jingjing's cousin
Li Ya Ze as Qiao Jingjing's brother
Zhou Yun Ru as Qiao Jingjing's sister

China Aerospace Science and Technology Corporation
Pan Yueming as Guan Zai
Chief designer of the Institute of Aerospace Research. Yu Tu's boss and best friend. He gave up his high-paying job to work with Yu Tu to design the same type of rocket. As Yu Tu's predecessor, he helps Yu Tu a lot in his work and life. When Yu Tu decides to give up his space career, Guan also believes that he will not give up. 
Zheng Xiao Ning as Director Hu, Yu Tu's senior
Wang Shi Huai as Director Zhang, Yu Tu's mentor
An Ge as Meng Anyu, Yu Tu's colleague
Zheng Qi as Zhou Gong, Yu Tu's colleague
Zhao Ke Di as Hu Kehang, Yu Tu's colleague
Lu Zhong as Chief Designer
Yan Zhi Ping as CEO Li's Designer
Sun Wei as Telemetry and Remote Control System Designer
Zhao Xiao Guang as Telemetry and Remote Control System Designer
Ge Ji Wei as Telemetry and Remote Control System Designer
Lu Tu as Mobile Designer
Han Bo as Mobile Designer
Xu Fan as GNC Designer

Qiao Jingjing's studio
Hu Ke as Sister Ling, 
Qiao Jingjing's manager. She has a gentle and easy-going personality and is very affectionate. She has always wanted Jingjing to fall in love and Qiao Jingjing is like a daughter to her.  She is both a teacher and a friend to Qiao Jingjing.
Sun Ya Li as Xiao Zhu, Qiao Jingjing's assistant
Liu Luo Xi as Dan Dan, Qiao Jingjing's PR
Luo Lei as Qiao Jingjing's driver

Entertainment Industry
Janice Wu as Chen Xue, Qiao Jingjing's good friend
Zhao Yingzi as Zhou Ziqi, Qiao Jingjing's rival
Yuan Cheng Jie as Duan Wu, Qiao Jingjing's partner
Wang Dong as Movie King Zhou
Lu Yong as Director Li

People around Yu Tu
Gina Jin as Xia Qing, Yu Tu's ex-girlfriend
Wang Yanlin as Zhai Liang, Yu Tu's good friend
People around Qiao Jingjing
Zheng He Hui Zi as Pei Pei, Qiao Jingjing's best friend
Ji Xiaobing as Su Zhi, Qiao Jingjing's ex-boyfriend
Tu Song Yan as A Guo, Sister Ling's husband & Qiao Jingjing's first game coach
King of Glory
Peng Bo as Alex, King of Glory executive
Liu Jiayi as Zhou Yin, King of Glory professional player. Qiao Jingjing's fan
Lu Yun Feng as Xia Xue, King of Glory professional player
Yang Jin Heng as He Liu, King of Glory professional player
Wang Yu Jie (王钰杰) as Qi Zhu, King of Glory professional player
Huang Cheng Cheng as Sha Bao, King of Glory player
Zhou Shuai as Long Wang, King of Glory player
Others
Li Hui Er (李绘儿) as Hui Hui, Sister Ling and A Guo's daughter
Chen Guan Ning as Ren Wang, an investment executive who admires Yu Tu
Yao Yi Qi as A Dou, reporter
Liu Yun Long as Xiao Lan, reporter
Liu Chao as Da Mao, reporter
Liu Li Li as Professor Wang, Director Zhang's wife
Teng Ai Xian as Director Hu's wife
Guo Tong Tong as Xia Qing's roommate
Gao Lu as Shen Jing, Guan Zai's wife
Sun Le as Guan Zhu, Guan Zai's brother
Zhang Yu Xuan as Guan Meng, Guan Zai and Shen Jing's son
Li Ruo Ning as Li Ruo
Wang Zheng as Qu Ming
Ning Xiao Zhi as Professor Xiao
Liu Wei Long as Manager Zhang
Extended
Ni Yan as Short Hair Girl
Chen He Yi as Spectacled Guy
Zhang Yi Wen as Middle Aged Guy
Yang Xu Chen as White Collared Girl
Ye Xiao Kai as Game Streamer
Hong Wei as CEO of Huo Jian
Yang Chen as Popular Artist Commentator
Wang Yi Lin as Classmate
Liu Zhe Hui as Classmate
Yan Jing Yao as CEO Fang
Zhu Wei Wei as Professor Zhao

Promotional activities
On August 2, 2020, Dilraba Dilmurat attended Tencent's annual video conference and announced that she would be starring with Yang Yang in the drama "You Are My Glory". Due to the schedule, Yang Yang could not attend the conference, but informed the media through VCR and the first poster was distributed to the media directly.

On September 29, 2020, the film crew officially launched in Shanghai and held the premiere ceremony at Fudan University. At 12:00, Weibo officially released the images of the shooting ceremony and the cast, at 13:00, Weibo crew posted the first image of the male and female leads.

See also
 Falling Into Your Smile, another 2021 streaming television series based on e-sports/competitive gaming
 List of Tencent Video original programming

References

External links

  You Are My Glory on Sina.com

2020s Chinese television series debuts
2021 Chinese television series debuts
2021 Chinese television series endings
Chinese television series
Chinese romantic comedy television series
Television shows based on Chinese novels
Chinese novels adapted into television series
Television series by Tencent Penguin Pictures